Abdoukerim Hamidou (born 15 April 1965) is a Togolese boxer. He competed in the men's welterweight event at the 1988 Summer Olympics.

References

External links
 

1965 births
Living people
Togolese male boxers
Olympic boxers of Togo
Boxers at the 1988 Summer Olympics
Place of birth missing (living people)
Welterweight boxers
21st-century Togolese people